Volujac is a village in the municipality of Šabac, Serbia. According to the 2002 national census, the village has a population of 382 people.

Climate 
The village is at its coldest in January with an average temperature of 30.38°F (-.9°C), and lows of 24.08°F (-4.4°C). The warmest month is July with an average temperature of 66.02°F (18.9°C) and highs of up to 77.9°F (25.5°C).

References

External links 

Populated places in Mačva District